The Under Secretary Transportation for Policy is a position within the United States Department of Transportation. The Under Secretary serves as an advisor to the United States Secretary of Transportation and Deputy Secretary of Transportation on matters of transportation policy.

From July 2019 to January 2021, Joel Szabat served as acting Under Secretary, succeeding Derek Kan. He left office on January 20, 2021.

Carlos Monje is the current Under Secretary, having been confirmed by the U.S. Senate on June 24, 2021 by voice vote. He was sworn into office by Secretary Pete Buttigieg on July 7, 2021.

References 

United States Department of Transportation agencies